Robert Harvey Morrison Farm and Pioneer Mills Gold Mine, also known as Cedarvale, is a historic home and farm and national historic district located near Midland, Cabarrus County, North Carolina. The district encompasses five contributing buildings and three contributing sites. The house was built about 1846, and is a two-story, three bay Greek Revival style frame dwelling. It features a full width one-story, hip roof porch. Also on the property are the contributing smokehouse (c. 1846), log barn (c. 1846), shed (c. 1900), shop (c. 1900), and the remains of the Pioneer Mills Gold Mine including the mine shaft site (c. 1832), ore mill site (c. 1832), and miner's cabin site (c. 1855).

It was listed on the National Register of Historic Places in 1990.

References

Farms on the National Register of Historic Places in North Carolina
Historic districts on the National Register of Historic Places in North Carolina
Greek Revival houses in North Carolina
Houses completed in 1846
Houses in Cabarrus County, North Carolina
National Register of Historic Places in Cabarrus County, North Carolina